The women's high jump event at the 1970 European Athletics Indoor Championships was held on 15 March in Vienna.

Results

References

High jump at the European Athletics Indoor Championships
High